Puzevo is a rural locality (a selo) and the administrative center of Puzevskoye Rural Settlement, Buturlinovsky District, Voronezh Oblast, Russia. The population was 1,977 as of 2010. There are 19 streets.

Geography 
Puzevo is located 26 km southwest of Buturlinovka (the district's administrative centre) by road. Klyopovka is the nearest rural locality.

References 

Rural localities in Buturlinovsky District